Martin–Fitch House and Asa Fitch Jr. Laboratory, also known as the Fitch House, is a historic home and laboratory located at Salem, Washington County, New York.  The house was built about 1787, and modified between about 1796 and 1812, and again about 1830. It is a two-story, five bay, Late Georgian style heavy timber frame dwelling.  It has a steep hipped slate roof with dormers and two interior chimneys.  The Asa Fitch, Jr. Laboratory, or “Bug House,” was built about 1825 and enlarged about 1860.  It is a small two-story, gable roofed frame rectangular building with a lean-to addition. Also on the property are the contributing barn (c. 1825 and later) and milk house (c. 1900).  It was the home and laboratory of Asa Fitch (1809-1879), first occupational entomologist in the U.S.

It was added to the National Register of Historic Places in 2014.

References

Houses on the National Register of Historic Places in New York (state)
Georgian architecture in New York (state)
Houses completed in 1787
Buildings and structures in Washington County, New York
National Register of Historic Places in Washington County, New York